Radstock Town Football Club is a football club based in Radstock, Somerset, England. The club is affiliated to the Somerset County FA.

History

Believed to be one of the oldest clubs in the county of Somerset, Radstock Town Football Club's official year of foundation, as recognised by The Football Association, was 1895, although there is evidence that appears to show that a Radstock team was playing as early as the 1860s. After playing in the Western League in 1897–98 as Radstock, they rejoined the League as Radstock Town in 1903–04, along with near neighbours Welton Rovers but resigned at the end of the 1910–11 season. They again rejoined the League after the First World War and the 1920s were to see a number of top six finishes. Indeed, 1923–24 was the club's most successful season, finishing as runners up to Lovell's Athletic by six points.

In the early days the club played home games at Roundhill, where the 'A' team and some youth section sides still play, before moving to Southill Park for a number of years, where their stay was enforced because of an American tank division being billeted at Southfield during the Second World War. The original move to Southfield took place in 1927, when as a First World War memorial the miners purchased the field through an issue of £5 shares. Unfortunately, it appears that the issue was not totally successful and as a consequence the control of the ground was gifted to the then Urban District Council and the Miners Welfare, who remain ultimately responsible for the area to this day.

The club's lengthy spell in the League came to an end after the 1959–60 season, when they, along with a number of other Somerset clubs – including Clandown, Frome Town, Peasedown Miners Welfare and Street – left to join county leagues. Radstock- along with Frome Town and Clandown –  chose to compete in the Wiltshire League, and won the championship in 1965–66 and 1966–67. In the 1970s Radstock switched to the Somerset County League, which they won in 1976–77 and again in 1978–79. Radstock rejoined the Western League for the 1979–80 season. They spent the next few years either in Division One or at the foot of the Premier Division.

At the end of the 1993–94 season Radstock were relegated to the Somerset County League, where they remained for ten seasons before gaining promotion after finishing in third place in 2003–04. The following season, third place in Division One was sufficient to ensure another promotion and the club is now established back in the Premier Division of the Western League.

With thirteen victories to its name the club has won the Somerset Senior Cup on more occasions than any other side in the county. The first time was in the competition's inaugural year of 1895–96 when they defeated Wells City 4–0 in a replayed final at Midsomer Norton. Other victories came in 1905–06, 1927–28, 1929–30, 1931–32, 1936–37, 1938–39, 1959–60, 1963–64, 1965–66, 1973–74, 1982–83 and 1984/85.

Ground

Radstock Town play their home games at Southfields Recreation Ground, Southfields, Radstock, BA3 3NZ.

Football staff

First Team Manager: Ray Johnston
Assistant Manager: Elliot Gibbons
First Team Coach: Ian Lanning
Reserves Manager: Liam Watson

Reserves Assistant: Russell Beveridge

Reserves Assistant: Richard Bowring
 
U18s Manager: Ian Lanning

U18s Assistant: Jamie Purnell

Honours
Western Football League Division One
Runners-up 1923–24, 1985–86
Western Football League Division Two
Runners-up 1920–21, 1926–27
Somerset Senior League Division One
Champions 1996–97
Somerset Senior Cup
Winners (13): 1895–96, 1905–06, 1927–28, 1929–30, 1931–32 (shared with Wells City), 1936–37, 1938–39, 1959–60, 1963–64, 1965–66, 1973–74, 1982–83, 1984–85,

Records
FA Cup
Third Qualifying Round 1925–26, 1926–27, 1928–29, 1938–39, 1945–46, 1946–47, 1954–55
FA Vase
Second Round 1975–76, 1976–77, 1980–81, 1988–89

References

Webb, Doug & Sandie:  A View From The Terraces: One Hundred Years of the Western Football League 1892–1992  (1992)

External links
Western League website

Football clubs in Somerset
Western Football League
Association football clubs established in 1895
1895 establishments in England
Radstock
Football clubs in England
Mining association football teams in England